Franci Lala (born 11 July 1999) is an Albanian footballer who plays as a defender for Luftëtari in the Kategoria e Parë.

Career

Luftëtari
In August 2019, Lala moved to Albanian Superliga club Luftëtari on a free transfer. He made his debut for the club in official competition on 24 August 2019, coming on as a 49th-minute substitute for Armenis Kukaj in a 3–0 away defeat to KF Tirana.

References

External links
Franci Lala at FSHF.org

1999 births
Living people
KF Korabi Peshkopi players
Luftëtari Gjirokastër players
Kategoria e Parë players
Kategoria Superiore players
Albanian footballers
Association football defenders